Najm al-Dīn 'Alī ibn 'Umar al-Qazwīnī al-Kātibī (died AH 675 / 1276 CE) was a Persian Islamic philosopher and logician of the Shafi`i school. A student of Athīr al-Dīn al-Abharī. His most important works are a treatise on logic, Al-Risala al-Shamsiyya, and one on metaphysics and the natural sciences, Hikmat al-'Ain.

He helped establish the Maragha observatory along with Nasir al-Din al-Tusi and several other astronomers.

Logic
His work on logic, the al-Risāla al-Shamsiyya (Logic for Shams al-Dīn), was commonly used as the first major text on logic in madrasahs, right down until the twentieth century and is "perhaps the most studied logic textbook of all time". Al-Katibi's logic was largely inspired by the formal Avicennian system of temporal modal logic, but is more elaborate and departs from it in several ways. While Avicenna considered ten modalities and examined six of them, al-Katibi considers many more modalized propositions and examines thirteen which he considers 'customary to investigate'.

See also
Logic in Islamic philosophy
Avicennian logic

References

Sources 

1276 deaths
13th-century Iranian mathematicians
Islamic philosophers
Alchemists of the medieval Islamic world
Year of birth unknown
Iranian chemists
13th-century Iranian philosophers
Iranian logicians
13th-century Iranian astronomers